Singpho is a dialect of the Jingpho language spoken by the Singpho people of Arunachal Pradesh and Assam, India. It is spoken by at least 3,000 people. "Singpho" is the local pronunciation of "Jingpho".

The Jingpho/Singpho (Jinghpaw, Chingp'o), or Kachin, language is a Tibeto-Burman language mainly spoken in Kachin State, Myanmar and Yunnan Province, China. The term Kachin language can refer either to the Jingpho language or to a group of languages spoken by various ethnic groups in the same region as Jingpho: Lisu, Lachit, Rawang, Zaiwa, Lhaovo, Achang (Ngo Chang), and Jingpho. These languages are from distinct branches of the highest level of the Tibeto-Burman family. The total estimated native speakers are 950,000 (2001 census).

Singpho is spoken the eastern extreme of northeastern India, such as Bordumsa Circle, Tirap District, Arunachal Pradesh, and also in nearby parts of Lohit District.

Singpho lacks the system of person-number agreement on an auxiliary particle found in the other dialects of Jingpho. DeLancey attributes this to creolization "in the broad sense", as a simplification brought about by a large population of enslaved Assamese rice farmers learning Singpho as a second language.

References

External links
Singpho dictionary (SEAlang Library)

Languages of China
Languages of Myanmar
Sal languages
Endangered languages of India
Languages of Assam
Languages of Arunachal Pradesh